

This is a list of the National Register of Historic Places listings in Montgomery County, Illinois.

This is intended to be a complete list of the properties and districts on the National Register of Historic Places in Montgomery County, Illinois, United States. Latitude and longitude coordinates are provided for many National Register properties and districts; these locations may be seen together in a map.

There are 13 properties and districts listed on the National Register in the county.

Current listings

|}

See also
 
 List of National Historic Landmarks in Illinois
 National Register of Historic Places listings in Illinois

References

 
Montgomery County